The C3a receptor also known as complement component 3a receptor 1 (C3AR1) is a G protein-coupled receptor protein involved in the complement system.

The receptor binds to complement component C3a, although there is limited evidence that this receptor also binds C4a in lesser mammals this has yet to be proven true in humans. C3a receptor modulates immunity, arthritis, diet-induced obesity and cancers

Agonists and antagonists 
Potent and selective agonists and antagonists for C3aR have been discovered.

References

Further reading

External links 
 
 
 

G protein-coupled receptors